The Circle is a comic book series written by Brian Reed, with art by Ian Hosfeld.

The story has been described as a "21st century 'A-Team'".

Publication history
The Circle was planned as an ongoing series but only the first five-issue story arc "Goliath Trap" has been published.

Notes

References

External links

The Circle #1 - Full Issue (with Commentary), Newsarama

Interviews

 Episode 5: The Circle with Brian Reed and Ian Hosfeld (audio), comiXology, 12 Nov 2007
 Getting to Know The Circle's Ian Hosfeld, Newsarama, 9 Oct 2007